Harry Dern (10 May 1929 – 24 January 2009) is a former Australian rules footballer who played with Carlton in the Victorian Football League (VFL).

Notes

External links 

Harry Dern's profile at Blueseum

1929 births
2009 deaths
Carlton Football Club players
Spotswood Football Club players
Australian rules footballers from Melbourne
People from Newport, Victoria